is a women's football team which plays in Japan's WE League.

History

The club was founded as named Yomiuri SC Ladies Beleza as women's club of Yomiuri SC (currently Tokyo Verdy) by Yomiuri Shimbun in 1981. Its team name, "Beleza", is Portuguese for "beauty". It was a founding member of the league in 1989 and is the only Japanese women's club to have never been relegated. In 1999, the club was transferred to Nippon TV and the club name was changed to NTV Beleza. In 2000, the team name was changed to Nippon TV Beleza. In September 2009, Nippon TV withdrew from management. However the club name remains Nippon TV Beleza, because the club signed a new contract of naming rights with Nippon TV.

Kits

Kit suppliers and shirt sponsors

Stadium
The Nippon TV Tokyo Verdy Beleza play their home matches at the Tama Athletic Stadium, Inagi Chuo Park, Ajinomoto Field Nishigaoka or Ajinomoto Stadium.

Youth teams
Nippon TV Menina is the nickname for Beleza's football academy. Players such as Aya Miyama and Karina Maruyama have been on its roster.

The Nippon TV Menina currently plays in the Kantō League Div.1 (Division 3).

Other sports
Verdy is a polideportivo and also fields teams in association football, volleyball, and triathlon. The Nippon TV Tokyo Verdy Beleza's men's football team is the Tokyo Verdy. The club plays in the J2 League, the second tier of football in the country.

Founded as Yomiuri FC in 1969, Tokyo Verdy is one of the most decorated clubs in the J.League, with honours including 2 J.League titles , 5 Emperor's Cups, 6 JSL Cup / J.League Cups and an Asian Club Championship title, and the most successful team in Japanese football history with 25 titles. 

The club was an original member ("Original Ten") of the J.League in 1993.

Coaching staff

Managerial history

Players

Current squad

Notable players
DF
 Yukari Kinga (2003–2010)
 Risa Shimizu (2013–2022)
MF
 Akemi Noda (1989–2004)
 Homare Sawa (1991–1998, 2004–2010)
 Aya Miyama (1999–2000)
 Mami Yamaguchi (2003–2004, 2010)
 Mizuho Sakaguchi (2012–2020)
 Yui Hasegawa (2013–2021)
FW
 Shinobu Ohno (1999–2010)
 Yūki Nagasato (2001–2009)
 Mana Iwabuchi (2007–2012)

Honours

Continental
AFC Women's Club Championship
Champions (1): 2019

Regional
Japan and South Korea Women's League Championship
Champions (1): 2011

Domestic
NTV Beleza has attained the domestic treble (winning the Nadeshiko League, League Cup, and Empress's Cup) thrice: 2007, 2018 and 2019.

Nadeshiko League Division 1
Champions (17): 1990, 1991, 1992, 1993, 2000, 2001, 2002, 2005, 2006, 2007, 2008, 2010, 2015, 2016, 2017, 2018, 2019 (record)
Runners-up (12): 1989, 1994, 1997, 1998, 1999, 2003, 2004, 2009, 2011, 2012, 2013, 2014
Empress's Cup
Champions (16): 1987, 1988, 1993, 1997, 2000, 2004, 2005, 2007, 2008, 2009, 2014, 2017, 2018, 2019, 2020, 2022 (record)
Runners-up (6): 1986, 1991, 1992, 1996, 2002, 2003,
WE League Cup
Runners-up (1): 2022–23
Nadeshiko League Cup
Champions (8): 1996, 1999, 2007, 2010, 2012, 2016, 2018, 2019 (record)
Runners-up (1): 1997
Nadeshiko Super Cup
Champions (2): 2005, 2007 (record)
Runners-up (1): 2006

Season-by-season records

Record in AFC Women's Club Championship

All results list Tokyo Verdy Beleza's goal tally first.

Transition of team name

Yomiuri SC Ladies Beleza: 1981–1991
Yomiuri Nippon SC Ladies Beleza: 1992–1993
Yomiuri-Seiyu Beleza: 1994–1997
Yomiuri Beleza: 1998
NTV Beleza: 1999
Nippon TV Beleza: 2000–2019
Nippon TV Tokyo Verdy Beleza: 20 January 2020 – present

See also
Japan Football Association (JFA)
2022–23 in Japanese football
List of women's football clubs in Japan

Notes

References

External links
Official website 

 
Nippon TV
Women's football clubs in Japan
1981 establishments in Japan
Japan Women's Football League teams
Football clubs in Tokyo
Inagi, Tokyo
Association football clubs established in 1981
WE League clubs